Eugene Keith Baker (born March 18, 1976) is a former American football wide receiver who was drafted from Kent State University in the 1999 NFL Draft by the Atlanta Falcons. He spent four seasons with the Falcons on their active roster and practice squad. He also spent time on the practice squads of the Buffalo Bills and the St. Louis Rams before signing with the Carolina Panthers in 2003.  He was in the New England Patriots preseason training camp last year, but was released before the regular season. Eugene was also allocated to play in NFL Europe, playing wide receiver for the Berlin Thunder.

Baker is listed at 6 ft 1 in. and 167 pounds.

Eugene Baker is an alumnus of Shady Side Academy, an independent private K-12 school in Pittsburgh.  At Shady Side Academy, he lettered four times in football and three times in both baseball and basketball.

The Pittsburgh Steelers signed Baker to a one-year deal on April 6, 2006, but was released on August 14 of that year.

On February 16, 2007, Baker signed with the Toronto Argonauts of the Canadian Football League.  Baker was a subsequent training camp cut on June 18, 2007.

On June 3, 2008, he joined the Erie RiverRats of the AIFA.

On February 16, 2009, he signed with the Wheeling Wildcats of the CIFL.

On February 17, 2010, he was welcomed back to Kent State University as an assistant coach under head coach Doug Martin.

See also
 List of NCAA major college football yearly receiving leaders

External links
Steelers release '06 schedule; sign wideout
10 things....Eugene Baker
Argonauts.ca bio
DatabaseFootball.com stats

Living people
1976 births
People from Monroeville, Pennsylvania
Players of American football from Pennsylvania
American football wide receivers
Kent State Golden Flashes football players
Atlanta Falcons players
Carolina Panthers players
Berlin Thunder players
Wheeling Wildcats players
Shady Side Academy alumni
Erie RiverRats players